Evolutionary Computation is a peer-reviewed academic journal published four times a year by the MIT Press. The journal serves as an international forum for researchers exchanging information in the field which deals with computational systems drawing their inspiration from nature.

According to the Journal Citation Reports, the journal has a 2016 impact factor of 3.826.

Editor-in-chief is Emma Hart. She succeeded Hans-Georg Beyer, who was editor-in-chief from 2010 until 2016.

References

English-language journals
Publications established in 1993
Evolutionary computation
Quarterly journals
Computer science journals
MIT Press academic journals